Cary Smith (born December 8, 1950) is a Republican member of the Montana Legislature.  He was elected to State Senate District 27 which represents a portion of the Billings area.

Smith serves as the Majority Leader of the Montana Senate.

References

External links
 Montana legislature page

1950 births
21st-century American politicians
Living people
Republican Party members of the Montana House of Representatives
Republican Party Montana state senators
People from Salt Lake City
Politicians from Billings, Montana
Politicians from Salt Lake City
University of Utah alumni